Mario Stojić (born May 6, 1980 in Mannheim) is a retired Croatian professional basketball player. He had played both the small forward and shooting guard positions for top division clubs in Croatia, Italy, Belgium, Germany and, most of his career, Spain.

Career statistics
 Correct as of 23 June 2007

External links 

 ACB Profile

1980 births
Living people
BC Oostende players
CB Lucentum Alicante players
Croatian expatriate basketball people in Spain
Croatian men's basketball players
German expatriate basketball people in Spain
German people of Croatian descent
KK Zagreb players
Liga ACB players
Menorca Bàsquet players
Pallacanestro Treviso players
Real Madrid Baloncesto players
Small forwards
KK Kvarner players
Sportspeople from Mannheim